Qart Hadasht or Qart-ḥadašt means "New City" in Phoenician and is
 the original name given to the ancient city of Carthage (located in today's Tunisia) by the Phoenicians
 the original name given to the current city of Cartagena (located in today's Spain) by the Carthaginian general Hasdrubal the Fair when he founded it in 227 BC to become the Carthaginian capital city of Iberia